Majano is a comune (municipality) in  the Italian region of Friuli-Venezia Giulia, located about  northwest of Trieste and about  northwest of Udine.

Majano borders the following municipalities: Buja, Colloredo di Monte Albano, Forgaria nel Friuli, Osoppo, Rive d'Arcano, San Daniele del Friuli.

Twin towns
 San Zenone degli Ezzelini, Italy, since 2000 
 Traversetolo, Italy

References

External links
 Official website

Cities and towns in Friuli-Venezia Giulia